Nicholas Carl Martin is an American technologist, entrepreneur, and educator best known for founding the international organization TechChange. Martin has delivered a number of speeches at the United Nations, the United States Department of State, and the United States Agency for International Development (USAID) on the role of technology in international development, online learning, capacity building and m-learning. His work with TechChange has been profiled by the New York Times, Fast Company, Forbes, and the Economist. Martin has also written numerous pieces on e-learning, m-learning, and m-health for multiple organisations, including the Chronicle of Higher Education, the Stanford Social Innovation Review, The Guardian, and Dowser.org.

Martin is a fellow of PopTech Social Innovation, Ariane de Rothschild, and the International Youth Foundation. In 2014, he was runner-up in the Society for International Development’s Rice Award which honors an innovator in the field of international development who is under the age of 32. Martin graduated from Swarthmore College with honors and holds a Bachelor of Arts in English literature and education. Martin also earned a Master of Arts in peace education from The University for Peace.

Prior to founding TechChange, Martin started an award-winning conflict resolution and technology program for Washington, D.C. elementary schools called DCPEACE. As of November 2013, Martin is also an adjunct faculty member at George Washington University and Georgetown University.

Martin is the son of William Flynn Martin who is a former United States Deputy Secretary of Energy.

References

External links
TechChange.org website

American company founders
American educators
Founders of schools in the United States
Information and communication technologies for development
People in international development
Social entrepreneurs
Living people
Year of birth missing (living people)
Swarthmore College alumni